Cladoceramus is an extinct genus of fossil marine pteriomorphian bivalves that superficially resembled the related winged pearly oysters of the extant genus Pteria. They lived in the Santonian stage of the Late Cretaceous.

Description 
Adult shells of Cladoceramus are small to very large size (more than 1 m in length). Many species with fine, discrete, juvenile ornamentation on umbo, consisting of closely and evenly to subevenly spaced raised concentric growth lines without rugae. Posterior auricle well-defined, triangular, separated from disc by auricular sulcus; a post-umbonal sulcus occurs in some species, as do very small anterior auricles ("ears").

Biostratigraphic significance 
The first appearance of the species Cladoceramus undulatoplicatus marks the beginning of the Santonian stage.

Distribution 
Fossils of the genus have been found in:
 Matulla Formation, Egypt
United States
 Forbes Shale, California
 Smoky Hill Shale, Niobrara Formation, Colorado and New Mexico
 Austin Chalk, Texas
 Mancos Shale, Wyoming

References 

Inoceramidae
Prehistoric bivalve genera
Index fossils
 
Fossils of Egypt
Cretaceous California
Paleontology in California
Cretaceous Colorado
Paleontology in Colorado
Cretaceous geology of New Mexico
Paleontology in New Mexico
Cretaceous Texas
Paleontology in Texas
Paleontology in Wyoming
Fossils of the United States
Fossil taxa described in 1961